Sertindole, sold under the brand name Serdolect among others, is an antipsychotic medication. Sertindole was developed by the Danish pharmaceutical company Lundbeck and marketed under license by Abbott Labs. Like other atypical antipsychotics, it has activity at dopamine and serotonin receptors in the brain. It is used in the treatment of schizophrenia. It is classified chemically as a phenylindole derivative.

Sertindole is not approved for use in the United States and was discontinued in Australia in January 2014.

Medical Uses
Sertindole appears effective as an antipsychotic in schizophrenia. In a 2013 study in a comparison of 15 antipsychotic drugs in effectivity in treating schizophrenic symptoms, sertindole was found to be slightly less effective than haloperidol, quetiapine, and aripiprazole, as effective as ziprasidone, approximately as effective as chlorpromazine and asenapine, and slightly more effective than lurasidone and iloperidone.

Adverse effects 

Very common (>10% incidence) adverse effects include:
 Headache
 Ejaculation failure
 Insomnia
 Dizziness

Common (1–10% incidence) adverse effects include:
 Urine that tests positive for red and/or white blood cells
 Sedation (causes less sedation than most antipsychotic drugs according to a recent meta-analysis of the efficacy and tolerability of 15 antipsychotic drugs. Causes only slightly [and non-significantly] more sedation than amisulpride and paliperidone)
 Ejaculation disorder
 Erectile dysfunction
 Orthostatic hypotension
 Weight gain (which it seems to possess a similar propensity for causing as quetiapine)

Uncommon (0.1–1% incidence) adverse effects include:

 Substernal chest pain
 Face oedema
 Influenza-like illness
 Neck rigidity
 Pallor
 Peripheral vascular disorder
 syncope
 Torsades de pointes
 Vasodilation
 Suicide attempt
 Amnesia
 Anxiety
 Ataxia
 Confusion
 Incoordination
 Libido decreased 
 Libido increased
 Miosis
 Nystagmus
 Personality disorder
 Psychosis
 Reflexes decreased
 Reflexes increased
 Stupor
 Suicidal tendency
 Urinary retention
 Vertigo
 Diabetes mellitus
 Abnormal stools
 Gastritis
 Gingivitis
 Glossitis
 Increased appetite
 Mouth ulceration
 Rectal disorder
 Rectal haemorrhage
 Stomatitis
 Tongue disorder
 Ulcerative stomatitis
 Anaemia
 Ecchymosis
 Hypochromic anaemia
 Leukopenia
 Hyperglycaemia
 Hyperlipemia
 Oedema
 Bone pain
 Myasthenia
 Twitching
 Bronchitis
 Hyperventilation
 Pneumonia
 Sinusitis
 Furunculosis
 Herpes simplex
 Nail disorder
 Psoriasis
 Pustular Rash
 Skin discolouration
 Skin hypertrophy
 Skin ulcer
 Abnormal vision
 Keratoconjunctivitis
 Lacrimation disorder
 Otitis externa
 Pupillary disorder
 Taste perversion
 Anorgasmia
 Penis disorder (gs)
 Urinary urgency
 Hyperprolactinaemia (which it seems to cause with a higher propensity than most other atypical antipsychotics do)
 Seizures
 Galactorrhoea

Rare (<0.1% incidence) adverse effects include:
 Neuroleptic malignant syndrome
 Tardive dyskinesia

Unknown frequency adverse events include:
 Extrapyramidal side effects (EPSE; e.g. dystonia, akathisia, muscle rigidity, parkinsonism, etc. These adverse effects are probably uncommon/rare according to a recent meta-analysis of the efficacy and tolerability of 15 antipsychotic drugs which found it had the 2nd lowest effect size for causing EPSE)
 Venous thromboembolism
 QT interval prolongation (probably common; in a recent meta-analysis of the efficacy and tolerability of 15 antipsychotic drugs it was found to be the most prone to causing QT interval prolongation)

Pharmacology

Sertindole is metabolized in the body to dehydrosertindole.

Safety and status

United States
Abbott Labs first applied for U.S. Food and Drug Administration (FDA) approval for sertindole in 1996, but withdrew this application in 1998 following concerns over the increased risk of sudden death from QTc prolongation. In a trial of 2000 patients on taking sertindole, 27 patients died unexpectedly, including 13 sudden deaths.  Lundbeck cites the results of the Sertindole Cohort Prospective (SCoP) study of 10,000 patients to support its claim that although sertindole does increase the QTc interval, this is not associated with increased rates of cardiac arrhythmias, and that patients on sertindole had the same overall mortality rate as those on risperidone. Nevertheless, in April 2009 an FDA advisory panel voted 13-0 that sertindole was effective in the treatment of schizophrenia but 12-1 that it had not been shown to be acceptably safe. , the drug has not been approved by the FDA for use in the USA.

European Union 
In the European Union, sertindole was approved and marketed in 19 countries from 1996, but its marketing authorization was suspended by the European Medicines Agency in 1998 and the drug was withdrawn from the market. In 2002, based on new data, the EMA's CHMP suggested that Sertindole could be reintroduced for restricted use in clinical trials, with strong safeguards including extensive contraindications and warnings for patients at risk of cardiac dysrhythmias, a recommended reduction in maximum dose from 24 mg to 20 mg in all but exceptional cases, and extensive ECG monitoring requirement before and during treatment. , sertindole is authorized in several states of the European Union.

References

External links 
 

Atypical antipsychotics
Chloroarenes
Imidazolidinones
HERG blocker
Indoles
Fluoroarenes
Piperidines
Withdrawn drugs